The Corpus Catholicorum (Corp. Cath., CCath., CC) is a collection of sixteenth-century writings by the leading proponents and defenders of the Roman Catholic Church against the teachings of the Protestant reformers.

The full title of the series is: Corpus Catholicorum: Werke katholischer Schriftsteller im Zeitalter der Glaubensspaltung i.e. Body of Catholic [writings]: Works of Catholic authors in the Time of the Splitting of the Faith.

The series, intended as a counterpart to the Corpus Reformatorum, was conceived by Professor Joseph Greving  (1868–1919) of the University of Bonn in 1915, and was announced that same year in the Theologische Revue as a "Plan für ein Corpus Catholicorum" or "Plan for a Corpus Catholicorum"

List of volumes in the Corpus Catholicorum
Vol. 1, Dr. Joseph Greving, S.J., ed., Münster in Westfalen, 1919, Verlag der Aschendorffeschen Verlagsbuchhandlung - HathiTrust. 
Johann Eck. Defensio contra amarulentas d. Andreae Bodenstein,  
Vol. 2, Johannes Metzler, S.J. ed., Münster in Westfalen, 1921 - HathiTrust. 
Johannes Eck, Epistola de Ratione Studiorum Suorum (1538) 
Erasmus Wolph, De Orbitu Ioan. Eckii Adversus Calumniam Viti Theodorici (1543)
Vol. 3. Joseph Schweizer, ed., Munster in Westfalen, 1920.
Johann Cochlaeus. Adversus cucullatum minotaurum wittenbergensem: De sacramentorum gratia iterum, (1523),
Vol. 4, Dr. Franz Xaver Thurnhofer, ed., Munster in Westfalen, 1921 -  HathiTrust. 
 Jerome Emser (Hieronymus Emser), De disputatione Lipsicensi, quantum ad Boemos obiter deflexa est, (1519)
A Venatione Luteriana Aegocerotis Assertio, (1519)
Vol. 5, Dr. Ulrich Schmidt O. F. M, ed., Münster in Westfalen, Aschendorff, 1922 - HathiTrust. 
Kaspar Schatzgeyer, O.F.M., Scrutinium Divinae Scripturae pro conciliatione dissidentium dogmatum (1522).
Vol. 34. Pierre Fraenkel, ed., Münster in Westfalen, Aschendorff, 1979.
Johann Eck. Enchiridion locorum communium adversus Lutherum et alios hostes ecclesiae; mit den Zusätzen von Tilmann Smeling. [Enchiridion (i.e., handbook or manual) of Commonplaces against Luther and other Enemies of the Church: with the additions by Tilmann Smeling]  
Vol. 43. Pierre Fraenkel, Münster, Aschendorff, 1992,  .
Henry VIII. Assertio septem sacramentorum adversus Martinum Lutherum, Henry VIII, King of England.
Vols. 45-48: Mary Ward und ihre Gründung: Die Quellentexte bis 1645 (Mary Ward and Her Foundation. The Source Texts to 1645), 4 vols, 2007, Sr. Ursula Dirmeier, CJ, ed., Münster 2007.
Vol. 45 (Band 1),   
Vol. 46 (Band 2),   
Vol. 47 (Band 3),   
Vol. 48 (Band 4)

Notes

Books
Joseph Greving, Plan für ein Corpus Catholicorum (Sonderabdruck aus der Theologischen Revue, Jahrgang. 14, i.e. printed separately from the Theological Review, vol. 14, Nr. 17/18), Aschendorffsche Verlagsbuchhandlung, [1916], Münster in Westphalen 
Joseph Greving, Johann Eck als junger Gelehrter. Eine literar- und dogmengeschichtliche Untersuchung über seinen Chrysopassus praedestinationis aus dem Jahre 1514,Aschendorff, [1906], Münster in Westphalen.

Counter-Reformation
Series of books
16th-century Christian texts